The January 1999 North American ice storm was a severe ice storm that struck the Washington, D.C. metropolitan area on January 14 and 15, 1999. Heavy ice accumulation bringing down power lines resulted in around 745,000 people in the area losing power. Many of the major power companies supplying Washington, D.C., Maryland, and Virginia had significant portions of their customer bases impacted. At the height of the storm, around one third of PEPCO's customers were without power, with some waiting up to two weeks for power to be restored.

External links
OPC investigation report
Edison Electric Institute report
CNN article

1999
Natural disasters in Washington, D.C.
1999 natural disasters
January 1999 events in North America
1999 in Washington, D.C.